Álvaro Obregón is one of the 113 municipalities that make up the state of Michoacán in Mexico. The municipality is named in honor of Álvaro Obregón, the President of Mexico from 1920 to 1924.

The municipality contains 35 localities, which include Álvaro Obregón, Tzintzimeo, El Calvario, Felipe Carrillo Puerto, and Lázaro Cárdenas.

References

Municipalities of Michoacán